Chelsi Guillen (born May 28, 1993 in Tucson) is an American former competitive pair skater who competed with partner Danny Curzon.

Programs

Results

References

External links 
 

American female pair skaters
1993 births
Living people
Sportspeople from Tucson, Arizona
21st-century American women
20th-century American women